Rob Linsenmeier is a researcher and Professor at Northwestern University, and lives in Chicago. He is a Professor of Biomedical Engineering and Neurobiology & Physiology. He receives funding for his work from the National Eye Institute. His recent work has been on the oxygenation of the retinas of cats, which serves as a good model for the human retina. He is the winner of the 2007 Theo C. Pilkington Outstanding Educator Award.

Rob is married to Joan A. W. Linsenmeier, who divides her working time between the Psychology Department and the Dean's office in the Weinberg College of Arts and Sciences at Northwestern. He has three children. He currently teaches Animal Physiology in the Biology Program.

References

Living people
Northwestern University faculty
Year of birth missing (living people)